Zum Stanglwirt is a German television series that ran from 1993-1997 starring Peter Steiner, Erma Wassmer and Gerda Steiner.

See also
List of German television series

External links
 

1993 German television series debuts
1997 German television series endings
Television shows set in Bavaria
German-language television shows
RTL (German TV channel) original programming